Virág Németh (born 19 June 1985) is a former professional tennis player from Hungary.

She won eight singles and five doubles titles on the ITF Circuit and reached one WTA Tour doubles final, in Budapest in 2004, partnering with Ágnes Szávay, losing to Petra Mandula and Barbara Schett.

WTA career finals

Doubles: 1 (runner-up)

ITF Circuit finals

Singles: 13 (8 titles, 5 runner-ups)

Doubles: 9 (5 titles, 4 runner-ups)

External links
 
 

Hungarian female tennis players
1985 births
Living people
People from Zalaegerszeg
Sportspeople from Zala County